Keith Edward Garnet Heron (24 May 1890 – 3 March 1975) was an Australian rules footballer who played with St Kilda in the Victorian Football League (VFL).

Notes

External links 

1890 births
1975 deaths
Australian rules footballers from Victoria (Australia)
St Kilda Football Club players